The Healing Powers of Dude is an American comedy television series created by Erica Spates and Sam Littenberg-Weisberg that premiered via streaming on Netflix on January 13, 2020.

Premise
The Healing Powers of Dude follows Noah Ferris, "an 11-year-old boy with social anxiety disorder" who gets an emotional support dog to help him manage his disorder.

Cast and characters

Main

 Jace Chapman as Noah Ferris, an 11-year-old boy who struggles with social anxiety disorder is going to a public school for the first time with his emotional support dog named Dude after being homeschooled previously
 Larisa Oleynik as Karen Ferris, Noah's mother, who works as a lawyer
 Mauricio Lara as Simon, Noah's extroverted friend with an alter ego he calls "Turbo"
 Sophie Kim as Amara, Noah's intelligent, disabled friend
 Laurel Emory as Embry Ferris, Noah's younger sister who has a knack for fashion
 Steve Zahn as the voice of Dude, Noah's emotional support dog
 Tom Everett Scott as Marvin Ferris, Noah and Embry's father and Karen's husband, who was an artist before he began homeschooling Noah and is starting to pursue art again

Recurring

 Peter Benson as Principal Myers, the principal of Roosevelt Middle School
 Raylene Harewood as Ms. Fleckberg, Noah, Simon, and Amara's English teacher at Roosevelt Middle School
 Gabrielle Quinn as Valerie, Noah's crush who shares his love of music
 Ethan Farrell as Dale, one of Noah and Simon's two twin bullies
 Vanessa Przada as Destiny, Noah and Simon's more aggressive bully
 Katy Colloton as the voice of Ms. Grumpy Pants, a neighbor's poodle

Production

Development
On June 20, 2019, it was announced that Netflix had given the production a series order for a first season consisting of eight episodes. The Healing Powers of Dude was created by Erica Spates and Sam Littenberg-Weisberg who were also expected to executive produce alongside Richie Keen and Dan Lubetkin. The series was released on January 13, 2020.

Casting
Alongside the initial series announcement, it was reported that Tom Everett Scott, Larisa Oleynik, Laurel Emory, Mauricio Lara, Sophie Jaewon Kim, Dude the Dog, Jace Chapman had been cast in starring roles.

Filming
Principal photography for the first season began on June 14, 2019, and ended on August 13, 2019, in Vancouver, British Columbia.

Episodes

Reception 
In 2021, the series won two Daytime Emmy Awards for Outstanding Principal Performance in a Children's Program and Outstanding Casting for a Live-Action Children's Program.

References

External links 
 
 

2020s American comedy television series
2020 American television series debuts
English-language Netflix original programming
Television about mental health
Television series about children
Television shows about dogs
Television series by Blue Ant Studios